Michael Levin is an American developmental and synthetic biologist at Tufts University, where he is the Vannevar Bush Distinguished Professor. Levin is a director of the Allen Discovery Center at Tufts University and Tufts Center for Regenerative and Developmental Biology. He is also co-director of the Institute for Computationally Designed Organisms with Josh Bongard.

Early life
Michael Levin was born in Moscow, USSR, in 1969, in a Jewish family. His parents faced antisemitism in the Soviet Union, and in 1978 took advantage of a visa program for Soviet Jews and moved the family to Lynn, Massachusetts. Levin's father was a computer programmer and worked for the Soviet weather service; his mother was a concert pianist.

Levin's family immigration was sponsored by Temple Sinai in Marblehead, Massachusetts. His family is still members of Temple Sinai. Levin stated that "... I've always lived within about a mile radius of where we landed in '78."

Career

Levin received dual bachelor's degrees in computer science and biology from Tufts University, and a Ph. D. in genetics from Harvard University (working in the lab of Cliff Tabin). His post-doctoral training was in the Cell Biology department of Harvard School of Medicine with Mark Mercola. Levin first established his independent lab at the Forsyth Institute in 2000. His research interests include: bioelectrical signals by which cells communicate to serve the dynamic anatomical needs of the organism during development, regeneration, and cancer suppression; basal cognition and intelligence in diverse unconventional substrates; and top-down control of form and function across scales in biology. He moved his group to Tufts in 2009. In 2010, he also became an associate member of the Wyss Institute of Harvard Medical School.

He is known for co-discovering the Xenobots, "Living robots made from frog skin cells can sense their environment". This research is focused on development of a multiplexed, microfluidic, Xenopus embryo culture system that will enable discovery of new drug targets and development of therapeutics when combined with multiomics and an integrated bioinformatics pipeline. This work was funded by the DARPA L2M program.

As of 2021, Levin's lab is working on synthetic biology applications of bioelectricity for cellular control; development of a bioinformatics of shape, AI tools for discovery and testing of algorithmic models linking molecular-genetic data to morphogenesis; using techniques from AI, computational neuroscience, and cognitive science to make models of morphogenesis.

Levin is co-editor in chief of 
Bioelectricity, founding associate editor of Collective Intelligence, and is on editorial advisory board of Laterality journals.

Awards and honors
Source:
 2020 Distinguished Professor, Tufts University
 2013 Distinguished Scholar Award, Tufts University
 2013 Certificate of Teaching Excellence from MBL Stem Cell Course
 2012 Scientist of Vision Award, IFESS
 2011 Vannevar Bush Endowed Chair appointment
 2004 The work on the molecular basis of left-right asymmetry (Cell 1995) was chosen by the journal Nature as a “Milestone in Developmental Biology in the last century”
 2001 “Best Talk” award at the Juan March Foundation conference on Left Right Asymmetry in Madrid, Spain
 2000 Junior Investigator Award, Society for Physical Regulation in Biology and Medicine
 1997-2000 Helen Hay Whitney Foundation post-doctoral fellowship
 1997 Alexander Imich Award, paper on cognitive science and consciousness
 1992-1995 NSF pre-doctoral fellowship for Ph.D. work
 1990, 1991 Hughes Scholarships for research in developmental biophysics

Publications
Michael Levin has published more than 350 papers; the full list can be found on his Google Scholar page or in his official biography at Tufts website or on his official website.
Some of the most cited papers:

References

External links
 Computer-designed organisms - webpage about Xenobot research
 TuftsNow - Scientists Create the Next Generation of Living Robots
 Michael Levin's TED talk about bioelectricity
 Quanta Magazine - Cells Form Into ‘Xenobots’ on Their Own
 NYTimes - Meet the Xenobots, Virtual Creatures Brought to Life
 The Biologist - ‘This is perhaps the first organism whose evolutionary history was in a computer’, interview with Michael Levin
 Wired - Cells Form Into Living ‘Xenobots’ on Their Own

Living people
Tufts University School of Arts and Sciences alumni
Harvard University alumni
Researchers of artificial life
American biologists
1969 births